William Charles Hoskins (March 14, 1914 – March, 1975), nicknamed "Big Bill", was an American Negro league outfielder in the 1930s and 1940s, spending the majority of his career with the Baltimore Elite Giants.

A native of Tallahatchie County, Mississippi, Hoskins broke into the Negro leagues in 1937, splitting time between the St. Louis Stars, Chicago American Giants, and Detroit Stars. He joined the Baltimore Elite Giants in 1938, and continued to play for Baltimore through 1946. He has the highest postseason batting average in baseball history, having batted .487 (19-for-39) in twelve postseason games played (1937, 1939). Hoskins was selected to play in the 1941 East–West All-Star Game, and went 1-for-5 in the contest. He died in 1975 at age 60 or 61.

References

External links
 and Seamheads

1914 births
1975 deaths
Baltimore Elite Giants players
Chicago American Giants players
Detroit Stars (1937) players
St. Louis Stars (1937) players
Washington Black Senators players
Kansas City Monarchs players
New York Black Yankees players
20th-century African-American sportspeople
Baseball outfielders